Anniella pulchra, the California legless lizard, is a limbless, burrowing lizard often mistaken for a snake.

Description
They have small, smooth scales typically colored silvery above and yellow below, although black or dark brown forms exist in Monterey County, California which were thought to be a separate subspecies at one point.

Taxonomy
There were formerly two subspecies of California legless lizard recognized based on individual color morphs: the silvery legless lizard, A. p. pulchra, and the black legless lizard, A. p. nigra. However, contemporary taxonomy considers them simply a melanistic morph. More recently (in 2013), A. pulchra has been split up into five different species: A. pulchra (with a narrower definition), A. alexanderae, A. campi, A. grinnelli, and A. stebbinsi.

Distribution and habitat
They live in loose, sandy soils or leaf litter, typically in sand dunes along the coast. They are found from Contra Costa County in northern California, all the way south to Baja California, although occurrences are often scattered. They require moisture to aid in shedding their skin. Without it, their vision and feeding can be affected, potentially starving the animal.

Diet
Their diet consists of mainly beetles, larval insects, termites, ants, and spiders.

Reproduction
Males are slightly smaller than females, otherwise there is no discernible difference between the two sexes. Females are ovoviviparous and probably breed between early spring and July, with 1 to 4 young born September–November. Young lizards resemble their parents except look like smaller versions of them.

References

Anniella
Legless lizards
Reptiles described in 1852
Reptiles of Mexico
Reptiles of the United States
Lizards of North America
Taxa named by John Edward Gray